The 1913–14 season was Galatasaray SK's 10th in existence and the club's 6th consecutive season in the IFL.

Squad statistics

Competitions

Istanbul Football League

Classification

Matches
Kick-off listed in local time (EEST)

Friendly Matches

Hilâl-i Ahmer Kupası
Galatasaray B Team won the cup.

References
 Futbol vol.2, Galatasaray. Tercüman Spor Ansiklopedisi.(1981) (page 555-556)
 Atabeyoğlu, Cem. 1453-1991 Türk Spor Tarihi Ansiklopedisi. page(66-67).(1991) An Grafik Basın Sanayi ve Ticaret AŞ

External links
 Galatasaray Sports Club Official Website 
 Turkish Football Federation - Galatasaray A.Ş. 
 uefa.com - Galatasaray AŞ

Galatasaray S.K. (football) seasons
Turkish football clubs 1913–14 season
1910s in Istanbul